Avalanche chess is a chess variant designed by Ralph Betza in 1977. After moving one of their own pieces, a player must move one of the opponent's pawns forward one square.

Game rules 
Rules are as normal chess except that after making a legal move, a player must move one of the opponent's pawns exactly one square forward (i.e. towards the player) to complete the turn. Capturing with an opponent's pawn is not permitted. If the opponent has no pawns or none can be moved, then that part of the turn is skipped. The pawn moved forward cannot be used by the opponent to capture en passant. If an opponent's pawn is moved to promotion, then the opponent chooses to what piece it promotes; if the promotion gives check, the opponent wins the game. If every legal pawn move forward gives check, then the opponent wins immediately, even if the player checked or mated the opponent previously that same turn.

Specifics regarding check  
 Check can be given on either or both halves of a player's turn. 
 A player in check must get out of check on the first half of their turn.
 A move into check is illegal even if moving an opponent's pawn on the second half of the turn would remove the check.

References

Further reading

External links 
 Avalanche chess at The Chess Variant Pages
 Avalanche Chess a simple program by Ed Friedlander (Java)

Chess variants
1977 in chess
Board games introduced in 1977